Venus and Cupid (Sleeping Venus) is a circa 1626 painting by Artemisia Gentileschi in the Virginia Museum of Fine Arts. Venus and Cupid is a depiction of a sleeping Venus, who reclines on a blue bed covering and rich crimson and gold tasseled pillow. She wears nothing except a thin wisp of transparent linen around her thigh. Her son Cupid fans her with richly colored peacock feathers as she drifts to sleep. He is gazing at her with an adored, raptured expression. In the background, there is a window looking out onto a moonlight landscape where a temple to the goddess lies. Venus's face has full cheeks, heavy lids, a prominent nose, and small protruding chin—all features of Gentileschi's own face.  The body movements are natural: Venus's hand rests lightly on her side, her legs are gently laid together. The work blends together realism and classicism through its iconography and the artist's style.

The painting was probably commissioned by an important and wealthy patron; Gentileschi painted the blue sheets on the canvas using two layers of lapis lazuli, an expensive material for artists to obtain. The depiction of a slumbering and vulnerable female, in contrast to her earlier works, is thought to indicate her willingness to adapt her style to the demands of patrons. It is possible that a second artist was commissioned to paint the landscape at the top left of the painting.  

The painting was first documented in a private collection in Rome in the 1980s. It was then acquired by the Barbera Piasecka Foundation, Princeton, New Jersey.  It was later acquired by the Adolph D. and Wilkins C. Williams Foundation who gifted it to the museum.

References

Sources

Paintings of Venus
1627 paintings
Paintings by Artemisia Gentileschi
Paintings of Cupid
Paintings in the collection of the Virginia Museum of Fine Arts